The ancient Egyptian Brazier hieroglyph is Gardiner sign listed no. Q7 for the cooking brazier. It is shown from the Old Kingdom in the style of a vertical burning flame upon four feet, but the hieroglyph has the flame hiding the fourth foot. Another Gardiner unlisted form has the four feet, with no flame, and in a plan view.

The brazier hieroglyph is used in Egyptian hieroglyphs as a determinative for the 'brazier', or 'flame', or words related to 'cooking with a brazier', or a substitute. The brazier also has the Egyptian language value of  'kh-('ḫ).

See also
List of hieroglyphs/Q, "Domestics and Funerary Furniture" from Gardiner's sign list
Brazier
Lake of Fire

References

Betrò, 1995. Hieroglyphics: The Writings of Ancient Egypt, Betrò, Maria Carmela, c. 1995, 1996-(English), Abbeville Press Publishers, New York, London, Paris (hardcover)
Budge. The Rosetta Stone, E.A.Wallace Budge, (Dover Publications), c 1929, Dover edition(unabridged), 1989. (softcover)

Egyptian hieroglyphs: domestic and funerary furniture